Ranalli is an Italian surname. Notable people with the surname include:

Cristian Ranalli, (born 1979) Italian footballer
George Ranalli (born 1946), American architect, scholar, and curator

Italian-language surnames